Cleo Elaine Powell (born January 12, 1957) is a justice of the Supreme Court of Virginia. She was sworn in on October 21, 2011 for a term ending on July 31, 2023. Justice Powell is the first African-American female to serve on Virginia's highest Court and the fifth woman to serve on the Court.

Born in Brunswick County, Virginia, she received an undergraduate degree from the University of Virginia in 1979 and received her Juris Doctor from the University of Virginia School of Law in 1982. Powell served at every level of Virginia's judicial system as a judge, working as a General District Court Judge in Chesterfield, Virginia and Colonial Heights, Virginia from 1993 until 2000, a Circuit Court Judge in the same jurisdictions from 2000 until 2008, and on the Court of Appeals of Virginia from 2008 until 2011. In 2013, Powell was honored as one of the Library of Virginia's "Virginia Women in History".

See also
List of African-American jurists

References

External links
 Powell's biography at the Library of Virginia

1957 births
Living people
African-American judges
People from Brunswick County, Virginia
University of Virginia alumni
University of Virginia School of Law alumni
Justices of the Supreme Court of Virginia
Judges of the Court of Appeals of Virginia
21st-century American judges
21st-century American women judges
21st-century African-American women
21st-century African-American people
20th-century African-American people
20th-century African-American women